Frank Sheriff (born 1957) is an abstract sculptor who was born in Yokohama, Japan to an American father and a Japanese-American mother.  Because his father was employed by the United States Army, Frank lived in Japan, Nevada, California, New York, Texas, North Carolina, and Hawaii during his childhood.  He started studying art at Oregon State University but returned to Hawaii to be with his mother when his father died in 1980.  He entered the University of Hawaii at Manoa, where he earned a BFA in 1984, and an MFA in 1989.

Frank Sheriff is known for both abstract and representational metal sculptures.  His work is in the collection of the Hawaii State Art Museum.  His sculptures in public places include:

 Ano Lani, a 1993 bronze sculpture at Kakaako Waterfront Park, Honolulu, Hawaii
 Mind and Heart, a 1995 cast bronze sculpture at the University of Hawaii at Manoa, Honolulu, Hawaii
 New Millenium Sky: Banyan and Stars, a 2000 aluminum sculpture at Princess Kaiulani Elementary School, Honolulu, Hawaii

References
 Contemporary Museum, Honolulu, Biennial II, The Contemporary Museum, Honolulu, 1995, pp. 19–21
 Yoshihara, Lisa A., Collective Visions, 1967-1997, An Exhibition Celebrating the 30th Anniversary of the State Foundation on Culture and the Arts, Art in Public Places Program, Presented at the Honolulu Academy of Arts, September 3-October 12, 1997, Honolulu, State Foundation on Culture and the Arts, 1997, p. 108.
 Art Inventories Catalog, Smithsonian American Art Museum

Footnotes

American sculptors
Modern sculptors
Artists from Hawaii
1957 births
Living people